New Texas was a colony established in São Paulo state, Brazil by remnants of the Confederacy after their surrender in the American Civil War. The New Texas colony's leader was Frank McMullen.

Background 
Following the end of the American Civil War, many former Confederates desired to flee the now-unified United States of America. This inclination was fueled by resentment towards and perceived oppression by their new leaders, along with a conviction that the economic and political conditions of the South would be slow to improve during the era of Reconstruction. For some, they chose to flee to another country in hopes of preserving their former way of life, including slavery, but as immigration was an expensive action, not all were able to participate. In addition to this, several Confederate leaders (including General Robert E. Lee) discouraged individuals from leaving the country. One popular destination for these displaced citizens was Brazil due to the fact slavery was still legal, resulting in up to 20,000 people emigrating from the South.

Initial settlement 
In 1865, Frank McMullen left for Brazil with 154 former citizens of the Confederacy in hopes of starting a successful colony. They were hoping to take advantage of the lax immigration laws of Brazil at the time. The Emperor of Brazil at the time, Dom Pedro II, actively encouraged Confederate immigration; there were efforts to provide financial assistance and land to the incoming Southerners. McMullen decided to start his settlement on a 50 square-leagues plot of land South of São Paulo, leading to the official foundation of New Texas.

See also 
 Americans in Brazil
 Confederados
 Confederate colonies

References 

American diaspora in South America
1867 establishments in Brazil
Social history of the American Civil War
19th century in Brazil
Confederate expatriates
American expatriates in Brazil

History of São Paulo (state)
Settlement schemes in South America